Herdtle & Bruneau was a French maker of motorcycles.  In 1905 they introduced motorized roller skates to the public.  Each skate contained a 1 hp motor; controls could then be affixed to the skater's belt, and would be linked via flexible cables to the skates.  Top speed for the contraption was said to be a brakeless .  Unsurprisingly, the idea did not catch on, and the line of motorized skates was discontinued by the end of the year.

References
David Burgess Wise, The New Illustrated Encyclopedia of Automobiles

Defunct motor vehicle manufacturers of France
Defunct motorcycle manufacturers of France